Michal Gonda (born 29 August 1982) is a Slovak football midfielder who currently plays for the Czech 2. liga club MFK Karviná.

Career
He spent three seasons for 1. FC Slovácko and he played for them 33 matches, including 5 appearances in the Gambrinus Liga.

External links
 MFK Karviná profile

References

1982 births
Living people
Slovak footballers
Association football midfielders
ŠK Slovan Bratislava players
MFK Dolný Kubín players
Czech First League players
1. FK Příbram players
1. FC Slovácko players
SFC Opava players
MFK Karviná players
Slovak Super Liga players